Gulshan Ewing (née Mehta) (1928 – 18 April 2020) was an Indian journalist and socialite. She edited two of India's most popular magazines – women's journal Eve's Weekly and film magazine Star & Style – between 1966 and 1989.

Career
Besides building a prominent reputation in the Eve's Weekly and Star & Style for some 23 years, she had earlier begun her career with the Dosu Karaka-edited Current and later moved over to Femina, which was published by the Times of India group. The Eve's Weekly was owned by the Somani group.

Tributes
Following her death in mid-2020, prominent Indian journalists who had worked with her around a generation earlier paid rich tributes to her memory. Among these was Sherna Gandhy's article in the Mid-Day.

Personal life and death
She was born in Mumbai to a Parsi family. In 1955, she married an Englishman named Guy Ewing with whom she moved to the UK in 1990. She died of COVID-19-related complications in  Richmond, London, on 18 April 2020.

External links
 Rembering Gulshan Ewing: The glamorous, kind hearted editor of Eve's Weekly
 Gulshan Ewing: Iconic editor dies of coronavirus in London
 Glamorous editor of Star & Style dies in UK care home
 Gulshan Ewing, pioneering magazine editor, dies of Covid-19 in London
 Gulshan Ewing: Iconic editor dies of coronavirus in London
 Veteran Indian journalist Gulshan Ewing dies of coronavirus complication in London

References

Indian journalists
2020 deaths
1928 births
People from Mumbai
British people of Parsi descent
English people of Parsi descent
Parsi people
Indian expatriates in England
Deaths from the COVID-19 pandemic in England